The Singapore Open Badminton Championships is an annual badminton tournament created in 1929. The Mixed Doubles was first contested in 1931. The tournament was canceled between 1942 and 1946 because of World War II and discontinued from 1974 to 1986. It returned in 1987 as Konica Cup and was held until 1999. There was no competition held in 1932, 1937, 1938, 1962, 1969, 1973, 1987 to 1989, 1993, 1996 and 2000. The tournament returned in 2001 under a new sponsor. It was again canceled between 2020 and 2021 due to the COVID-19 pandemic.

Below is the list of the winners at the Singapore Open in mixed doubles.

History
In the Amateur Era, Ong Poh Lim (1950–1954, 1956, 1960–1961, 1963) holds the record for the most titles in the Mixed Doubles, winning Singapore Open nine times. He share the record for most consecutive titles of five (1950–1954) with Jessie Ong (1957–1961). The most back-to-back finals ever reached in mixed doubles was also achieved by Ong when he reached seven consecutive finals between 1950 and 1956.

Since the Open Era of badminton began in late 1979, Liliyana Natsir holds the record for the most Mixed Doubles titles with six. Kim Dong-moon and Ra Kyung-min (2002–2003), Tontowi Ahmad and Liliyana Natsir (2013–2014), Dechapol Puavaranukroh and Sapsiree Taerattanachai (2019 and 2022, no competition in 2020 and 2021) share the record for most consecutive victories with two.

Finalists

Amateur era

Open era

Statistics

Multiple champions
Bold indicates active players.

Champions by country

Multiple finalists
Bold indicates active players.Italic indicates players who never won the championship.

See also
 List of Singapore Open men's singles champions
 List of Singapore Open women's singles champions
 List of Singapore Open men's doubles champions
 List of Singapore Open women's doubles champions

References

External links
Singapore Badminton Association
Badminton Asia

Singapore Open (badminton)